Wolke Janssens (born 11 January 1995) is a Belgian professional footballer who plays for Sint-Truiden as a defender.

References

Belgian footballers
Belgian Pro League players
Challenger Pro League players
1995 births
Living people
K.F.C. Dessel Sport players
Sint-Truidense V.V. players
Lierse S.K. players
Association football forwards